Louis Thornton (born April 26, 1963) is a former Major League Baseball outfielder and pinch runner. He played parts of five seasons in the major leagues between 1985 and 1990.

Sources

1963 births
Living people
African-American baseball players
American expatriate baseball players in Canada
Baseball players from Montgomery, Alabama
Buffalo Bisons (minor league) players
Columbia Mets players
Kingsport Mets players
Lynchburg Mets players
Major League Baseball outfielders
New York Mets players
Syracuse Chiefs players
Tidewater Tides players
Toronto Blue Jays players
21st-century African-American people
20th-century African-American sportspeople